The 174th Street station was a local station on the demolished IRT Third Avenue Line in the Bronx, New York City. It was originally built on July 20, 1891, by the Suburban Rapid Transit Company and had three tracks and two side platforms. The next stop to the north was Tremont Avenue–177th Street, but in its last years it rose over the Cross Bronx Expressway in order to get there. The next stop to the south was Claremont Parkway. The station closed on April 29, 1973.

References

External links 

IRT Third Avenue Line stations
Railway stations in the United States opened in 1891
Railway stations closed in 1973
1891 establishments in New York (state)
1973 disestablishments in New York (state)
Former elevated and subway stations in the Bronx
Third Avenue